HMNZS Rotoiti was a Lake-class patrol vessel of the Royal New Zealand Navy. It was commissioned in 1975 and deleted in 1991.

Rotoiti was one of three ships of this name to serve in the Royal New Zealand Navy and is named after either Lake Rotoiti in North Island, or Lake Rototi in South Island (or perhaps both).

See also 
 Patrol boats of the Royal New Zealand Navy

Notes

References 
 McDougall, R J  (1989) New Zealand Naval Vessels. Page 98-100. Government Printing Office. 

Ships built in Lowestoft
Rotoiti